William Flynn is a fictional character from the 1926 play Chicago, written by Maurine Dallas Watkins, and its various derivative works and remakes.

Character background
Billy Flynn is one of the city of Chicago's most effective defense attorneys; he can win any trial and usually represents women who have murdered their lovers. He has never lost a case involving a female defendant in his whole career, but in turn charges high fees for his services ($5,000), demands payment in full up-front, and never takes pro bono work. In rare cases, such as Roxie Hart's, he will take a discount rate in exchange for a cut of proceeds from selling ephemera and media rights fees related to the case. In the play, he defends Hart and her rival Velma Kelly, winning both cases.

Most of Billy Flynn's clients actually did commit the murder they are accused of; therefore he usually attempts to conjure a defense of self-defense or insanity. He will often turn trials into a media circus and public spectacle, regularly manipulates witnesses to fit his narratives (which usually have no resemblance to the truth), and keeps a tabloid sob sister, Mary Sunshine, on retainer to ensure positive press coverage for his clients. He considers his profession to be akin to the entertainment industry, with himself as an A-list star in the field.

In the musical, Flynn sings three songs. "All I Care About (is Love)" serves as Flynn's jingle, in which the crooner claims not to care about wealth or materialism and works for his love of women (later revealed to be a complete lie), "They Both Reached For The Gun (The Press Conference Rag)" serves as a ventriloquist act with a call-and-response between Billy's "dummy" Roxie and the press, and "Razzle Dazzle" (a champagnesque piece with what Jerry Orbach described as "Brechtian subtlety") serves as the explanation of Flynn's modus operandi: make the case a distraction so that the jury loses attention.

Flynn is a composite character based on real-life Chicago attorneys of the era, William Scott Stewart and W. W. O'Brien. In the musical adaptation, his style is based upon Ted Lewis.

Portrayals
Edward Ellis in the 1926 Broadway play
Robert Edeson in the 1927 film
Adolphe Menjou in the 1942 film Roxie Hart
Jerry Orbach in the 1975 Broadway musical
Richard Gere in the 2002 film

References

Fictional American lawyers
Musical theatre characters
Literary characters introduced in 1926
Fictional characters from Chicago
Fictional Irish American people
Male literary villains
Male film villains